The National Folk Festival (NFF) is an itinerant folk festival in the United States. Since 1934, it has been run by the National Council for the Traditional Arts (NCTA) and has been presented in 26 communities around the nation. After leaving some of these communities, the National Folk Festival has spun off several locally run folk festivals in its wake, including the Lowell Folk Festival, the Richmond Folk Festival, the American Folk Festival and the Montana Folk Festival.  The most recent spin-off is the North Carolina Folk Festival. The next year of the festival will be held in Salisbury, Maryland, in 2022, the fourth year of a four-year run in Salisbury.

Beginnings in St. Louis
The National Folk Festival in the United States (known also as the National) was founded by folklorist Sarah Gertrude Knott and first presented in St. Louis in 1934. The Festival is the oldest multi-cultural traditional arts celebration in the nation and the first event of national stature to put the arts of many nations, races and languages into the same event on an equal footing. Some of the artists presented at the first festival are now legendary and the recordings and other documentation made possible by the National are precious. W.C. Handy's first performance on a desegregated stage was at the 1938 National. It was the first event of national stature to present the blues, Cajun music, a polka band, a Tex-Mex conjunto, a Sacred Harp ensemble, Peking opera, and others.

Locations

References

External links
 Folklife Magazine history of the National Folk Festival part I
 Folklife Magazine history of the National Folk Festival part II

Culture of Bangor, Maine
Folk festivals in the United States
Culture of Richmond, Virginia
Music festivals established in 1934
1934 establishments in Missouri